Joseph John Camic Jr. (November 28, 1922 – April 3, 2011) was an American professional basketball player. He played for the Tri-Cities Blackhawks and Hammond Calumet Buccaneers in the National Basketball League and averaged 6.3 points per game.

References

1922 births
2011 deaths
Amateur Athletic Union men's basketball players
United States Army personnel of World War II
American men's basketball players
Basketball players from Youngstown, Ohio
Basketball players from Pennsylvania
Duquesne Dukes men's basketball players
Forwards (basketball)
Guards (basketball)
Hammond Calumet Buccaneers players
People from Allegheny County, Pennsylvania
Tri-Cities Blackhawks players